The Idle Rich may refer to:

 The Idle Rich, 1914 American silent film directed by Sidney Olcott
 The Idle Rich, 1921 American silent comedy film directed by Maxwell Karger
 The Idle Rich, 1929 American comedy film directed by William C. deMille

See also
The Idle Class, 1921 Charlie Chaplin film